General Abdulsalami Abubakar became head of state in Nigeria on 9 June 1998 after the death of General Sani Abacha. Abubakar replaced or transferred the military administrators of most of the states, and instructed the new team to prepare for a smooth transition to democracy in May 1999. The elected president Olusegun Obasanjo required all former military administrators to retire from the military in June 1999.

References

Government of Nigeria
Politics of Nigeria